Otis Park and Golf Course is a historic park, golf course, and national historic district located at Bedford, Lawrence County, Indiana.  The district encompasses five contributing buildings, four contributing sites, eights contributing structures, and five contributing objects in a park originally established in 1923 and donated to city of Bedford in 1935.  It was largely developed as a Works Progress Administration project between 1937 and 1941, and includes examples of Classical Revival and Bungalow / American Craftsman style architecture.  Notable contributing resources include the band shell (1939), rock garden, bathhouse, clubhouse, four picnic shelters (1938), shelter house, and gazebo.

It was listed in the National Register of Historic Places in 2002.

References

Parks in Indiana
Works Progress Administration in Indiana
Historic districts on the National Register of Historic Places in Indiana
Neoclassical architecture in Indiana
Historic districts in Lawrence County, Indiana
National Register of Historic Places in Lawrence County, Indiana
Parks on the National Register of Historic Places in Indiana
Sports venues on the National Register of Historic Places in Indiana